Mel Rogers (born April 23, 1947) is a former American football linebacker. He played for the San Diego Chargers in 1971 and from 1973 to 1974, the Los Angeles Rams in 1976 and for the Chicago Bears in 1977.

References

1947 births
Living people
Players of American football from St. Petersburg, Florida
American football linebackers
Florida A&M Rattlers football players
San Diego Chargers players
Los Angeles Rams players
Chicago Bears players